Sergey Petrov may refer to:
Sergey Anatolyevich Petrov (born 1954), Russian businessman and politician
Sergey Petrov (politician) (born 1965), Russian politician
Sergei Petrov (footballer, born 1974), Russian football player and manager
Sergei Petrov (born 1991), Russian footballer
Sergei Petrov, a pseudonym used by Bob Dylan for his work on Masked and Anonymous 
Serhiy Petrov (born 1997), Ukrainian footballer

See also
Petrov (surname)